Nakhon Si Thammarat Province Stadium is a multi-purpose stadium in Nakhon Si Thammarat province, Thailand. It is currently used mostly for football matches and is the home stadium of Nakhon Si United. The stadium holds 5,000 people.

Football venues in Thailand
Multi-purpose stadiums in Thailand
Buildings and structures in Nakhon Si Thammarat province
Sport in Nakhon Si Thammarat province